The following is a list of notable deaths in September 2001.

Entries for each day are listed alphabetically by surname. A typical entry lists information in the following sequence:
 Name, age, country of citizenship at birth, subsequent country of citizenship (if applicable), reason for notability, cause of death (if known), and reference.

September 2001

1
Daniel C. Drucker, 83, American engineer and academic, leukemia.
Bobby Evans, 74, Scottish football player.
Ruthild Hahne, German sculptor.
Budimir Metalnikov, 75, Soviet/Russian screenwriter and film director.
Brian Moore, 69, English sports commentator.
Ted Mulry, 53, English born Australian singer/songwriter.
Sir John Robertson, 76, New Zealand Chief Ombudsman (1986–1994).
Julian Scheer, 75, American journalist, author, public relations specialist and conservationist.
James Lopez Watson, 79, American jurist.
Fos Williams, 79, Australian rules footballer.

2
Christiaan Barnard, 78, South African heart surgeon, first to perform a human-to-human heart transplant.
Troy Donahue, 65, American actor, (A Summer Place, Rome Adventure).
Sir Arthur Gilbert, 88, British-born American real estate developer and philanthropist.
Horace A. Jones, 94, American horse trainer.
Jay Migliori, 70, American saxophonist (Supersax).
John Overall, 88, Australian architect.

3
Ferruccio Amendola, 71, Italian actor and voice actor, throat cancer.
John Chapman, 74, British actor and playwright (Dry Rot, Not Now, Darling, There Goes the Bride).
Hilary Corke, 80, British writer, composer and mineralogist.
Pauline Kael, 82, American movie critic.
Carl Lindquist, 82, American baseball player.
Thuy Trang, 27, Vietnamese-American actress (Mighty Morphin Power Rangers, The Crow: City of Angels).

4
Maria Alfero, 79, Italian sprinter.
Pete Brown, 70, American professional football player (Georgia Tech) (San Francisco 49ers: 1953–1954).
Ove Lundell, 71, Swedish professional motocross racer, cancer.
Sándor Simó, 67, Hungarian film producer, director and screenwriter.
Kathleen Sully, 91, English novelist.

5
Vladimir Žerjavić, 89, Croatian economist and demographer, murdered in Jasenovac.
Heywood Hale Broun, 81, American sports writer and broadcaster.
Jørgen Hviid, 85, Danish and Latvian multi-sport athlete.
David Peter Lafayette Hunter, 81, British Royal Marines officer.
Numa Monnard, 82, Swiss footballer.
George F. Pott Jr., 58, American politician, liver and kidney disease.
Hemish Shah, 33, British poker player.
Bhappi Sonie, 73, Indian film director and producer.
John Paul Thomas, 74, American visual artist.
Justin Wilson, 87, American Cajun chef and humorist.
Vladimir Žerjavić, 89, Croatian economist and demographer.

6
Megan Connolly, 27, Australian actress, heroin overdose.
Carl Crack, 30, German musician (Atari Teenage Riot).
Franco Gentilesca, 58, American stage director.
John Hurd, 87, American Olympic fencer (men's fencing team foil at the 1936 Summer Olympics).
Jacques Katmor, 63, Israeli counterculture experimental filmmaker and artist, alcoholism.
Iosif Vorovich, 81, Soviet mathematician, scientific engineer, and author.

7
Igor Buketoff, 86, American composer, conductor and teacher.
Sergio Garavini, 75, Italian politician, writer and trade unionist.
Lou Grant, 81, American editorial cartoonist (Oakland Tribune, Los Angeles Times, Newsweek, Time).
Bunny Lewis, 82, English music manager, record producer and composer.
Spede Pasanen, 71, Finnish television star.
Clark Thomas Rogerson, 82, American mycologist.
Glenn Thompson, 60, American book publisher and activist, cancer.
Billie Lou Watt, 77, American film and television actress (Search for Tomorrow), and voice actress (Astro Boy, Elsie the Cow).

8
Eleanor Cullis-Hill, 87, Australian architect.
Gabriel Green, 76, American  early UFOlogist.
Paul Ooghe, 102, Belgian soldier and World War I veteran.
Tino Petrelli, 79, Italian photographer.

9
Tommy Hollis, 47, American actor, complications of diabetes.
Ahmad Shah Massoud, 48, Afghan Northern Alliance military commander, murdered.
Jane Bradley Pettit, 82, American philanthropist, lung cancer.
William Sefton, Baron Sefton of Garston, 86, British politician.
Shinji Sōmai, 53, Japanese film director, cancer.

10
DJ Uncle Al, 32, American disc jockey.
Samar Chowdhury, 71, Indian politician.
Magnar Ingebrigtsli, 68, Norwegian Olympic cross-country skier (men's 15 kilometre cross-country skiing at the 1956 Winter Olympics).
Antonio da Costa Santos, Brazilian architect and politician.
Alexey Suetin, 74, Soviet Russian chess player and chess writer.

11
Clem Dreisewerd, 85, American baseball player.
Aurelio Genghini, 93, Italian Olympic long-distance runner (men's marathon at the 1936 Summer Olympics).
Henry Herbert, 7th Earl of Carnarvon, 77, British peer and racing manager to Queen Elizabeth II.
Henryk Siwiak, 46, Polish émigré to New York City, shot.
Alice Stewart Trillin, 63, American educator, author and film producer, heart failure.
Vince Ventura, 84, American baseball player.
Nearly 3,000 people were killed in the September 11 attacks, including:
David Angell, 55, American television producer and screenwriter (Frasier, Wings). Passenger of American Airlines Flight 11.
Mohamed Atta, 33, Egyptian ringleader and one of the hijackers of American Airlines Flight 11.
Garnet Bailey, 53, Canadian ice hockey player (Boston Bruins) and scout. member of Stanley Cup. Passenger of United Airlines Flight 175.
Fayez Banihammad, 24, Emirati, one of the hijackers of United Airlines Flight 175. 
Mark Bavis, 31, American ice hockey player (Providence Bruins) and scout. Passenger of United Airlines Flight 175. 
Todd Beamer, 32, American airline passenger United Airlines Flight 93.
Berry Berenson, 53, American actress (Remember My Name, Cat People). and photographer. Passenger of American Airlines Flight 11.
Carolyn Beug, 48, American filmmaker and video producer. Passenger of American Airlines Flight 11.
Bill Biggart, 54, American photojournalist.
Mark Bingham, 31, American public relations executive. Passenger of United Airlines Flight 93.
Patrick J. Brown, 48, American fire captain.
Ronald Paul Bucca, 47, American fire marshal. 
William Francis Burke Jr., 46, American fire captain.
Charles Burlingame, 51, American airline pilot American Airlines Flight 77.
Tom Burnett, 38, American executive. Passenger of United Airlines Flight 93.
William E. Caswell, 54, American physicist. Passenger of American Airlines Flight 77. 
Edna Cintron, 46, American business executive.
Kevin Cosgrove, 46, American business executive.
Welles Crowther, 24, American investment banker. 
Frank De Martini, 49, American architect. 
Melissa Doi, 32, American businesswoman. 
William M. Feehan, 71, American deputy fire commissioner.
Wilson Flagg, 62, former United States Navy Rear Admiral, who was censured over the 1991 Tailhook scandal.
Peter J. Ganci, Jr., 54, Chief of the Fire Department of New York.
Keith A. Glascoe, 38, American firefighter and actor. (Léon: The Professional, 100 Centre Street, The Pirates of Central Park). 
Ahmed al-Ghamdi, 22, Saudi Arabian, one of the hijackers of United Airlines Flight 175.
Hamza al-Ghamdi, 20, Saudi Arabian, one of the hijackers of United Airlines Flight 175.
Saeed al-Ghamdi, 21, Saudi Arabian, one of the hijackers of United Airlines Flight 93.
Jeremy Glick, 31, American airline passenger United Airlines Flight 93.
Lauren Grandcolas, 38, American author. Passenger of United Airlines Flight 93.
Nezam Hafiz, 32, American cricketer. 
Mohammad Salman Hamdani, 23, Pakistani American research technician.
Hani Hanjour, 29, Saudi Arabian, one of the hijackers of American Airlines Flight 77.
Leonard Hatton, 45, American FBI agent.
Nawaf al-Hazmi, 25, Saudi Arabian, one of the hijackers of American Airlines Flight 77.
Salem al-Hazmi, 20, Saudi Arabian, one of the hijackers of American Airlines Flight 77.
Ahmed al-Haznawi, 20, Saudi Arabian, one of the hijackers of United Airlines Flight 93.
LeRoy Homer Jr., 36, American airline pilot United Airlines Flight 93.
Ziad Jarrah, 26, Lebanese, one of the hijackers of United Airlines Flight 93.
Charles Edward Jones, 48, American astronaut. Passenger of American Airlines Flight 11. 
Mychal Judge, 68, Chaplain of the Fire Department of New York.
Neil David Levin, 46, American businessman, politician and executive director of the Port Authority of New York and New Jersey. 
Daniel M. Lewin, 31, American-Israeli mathematician and entrepreneur co-founder of Akamai Technologies, Former member of Sayeret Matkal, Passenger of American Airlines Flight 11.
Waleska Martinez, 37, Puerto Rican-American airline passenger United Airlines Flight 93.
Eamon McEneaney, 46, American Hall of Fame lacrosse player. 
Timothy Maude, 53, Lieutenant General United States Army officer.
Khalid al-Mihdhar, 26, Saudi Arabian, one of the hijackers of American Airlines Flight 77.
Majed Moqed, 24, Saudi Arabian, one of the hijackers of American Airlines Flight 77.
Ahmed al-Nami, 24, Saudi Arabian, one of the hijackers of United Airlines Flight 93.
John Ogonowski, 50, American pilot American Airlines Flight 11.
Barbara Olson, 45, American lawyer and television commentator (CNN, Fox News Channel). Passenger of American Airlines Flight 77.
Abdulaziz al-Omari, 22, Saudi Arabian, one of the hijackers of American Airlines Flight 11.
John P. O'Neill, 49, American counterterrorism expert and special agent FBI.
Betty Ong, 45, American flight attendant American Airlines Flight 11. 
Pablo Ortiz, 49, American construction superintendent.
Orio Palmer, 45, American firefighter.
Dominick Pezzulo, 36, American-Italian police officer.
Sneha Anne Philip, 31, Indian-American physician, presumed to have been a victim of the attacks.
Rick Rescorla, 62, British-American soldier, World Trade Center security chief for Morgan Stanley and Dean Witter.
Michael Richards, 38, Jamaican-born American sculptor.
Marwan al-Shehhi, 23, Emirati, one of the hijackers of United Airlines Flight 175.
Mohand al-Shehri, 22, Saudi Arabian, one of the hijackers of United Airlines Flight 175.
Wail al-Shehri, 28, Saudi Arabian, one of the hijackers of American Airlines Flight 11.
Waleed al-Shehri, 22, Saudi Arabian, one of the hijackers of American Airlines Flight 11. 
Mari-Rae Sopper, 35,  American gymnastics coach, Passenger of American Airlines Flight 77.
Satam al-Suqami, 25, Saudi Arabian, one of the hijackers of American Airlines Flight 11.
Madeline Amy Sweeney, 35, American flight attendant American Airlines Flight 11. 
Dan Trant, 40, American bond trader and basketball player. (1984) 
Abraham Zelmanowitz, 55, American computer programmer.

12
Carmen Rico Godoy, 62, Spanish writer, journalist and feminist.
Marilyn Meseke, 84, American beauty queen.
Joseph Bruno Slowinski, 38, American herpetologist, snake bite.
Victor Wong, 74, American actor (The Joy Luck Club, The Last Emperor, The Golden Child).

13
Jorge Comellas, 84, Cuban baseball player.
Johnny Craig, 75, American comic book artist.
Jaroslav Drobný, 79, Czechoslovakian tennis player (Wimbledon Championship) and Olympic ice hockey player (silver medal winner at the 1948 Winter Olympics).
Gunnar Dybwad, 92, German-American professor and disabled people's rights advocate.
Dorothy McGuire, 85, American actress (nominated for Academy Award for Best Actress for Gentleman's Agreement).
Fayga Ostrower, 80, Polish-Brazilian visual artist.
Charles Régnier, 87, German actor and director, stroke.
Alex Scott, 64, Scottish footballer.

14
Barbara Ansell, 78, British paediatric rheumatologist.
Judy Green, 66, American novelist, socialite and philanthropist.
George Ireland, 88, American basketball coach (Loyola of Chicago 1963 NCAA Championship).
Stelios Kazantzidis, 70, Greek singer.
Francisco Urcuyo, 86, Nicaraguan politician, vice president (1967-1972, 1979).

15
Herbert Burdenski, 79, German football player and coach.
Fred de Cordova, 90, American stage, film and television director and producer (The Tonight Show Starring Johnny Carson).
June Salter, 69, Australian actor.
Donn Kushner, 74, American Canadian scientist and writer.
Paul "Tank" Younger, 73, American gridiron football player.

16
Ann-Margret Ahlstrand, 96, Swedish Olympic high jumper.
Samuel Z. Arkoff, 83, American film producer (Futureworld, The Amityville Horror).
Patrick Cosgrave, 59, Irish journalist and writer.
Max Ephraim Jr, 82, American railroad mechanical engineer, aided transition from steam-powered to diesel-electric locomotives.
Jerry Harper, 67, American basketball player (University of Alabama from 1952 to 1956).
Donald Hume, 86, American Olympic rower (gold medal winner in men's rowing eight at the 1936 Summer Olympics)(.
Lyle Stevik, 25, American unnamed motel guest, suicide by hanging.

17
Hizgil Avshalumov, 88, Soviet novelist, poet and playwright.
Bubba Church, 77, American baseball player.
Paul Cummings, 48, American middle and long-distance runner, drowning accident.
Dalilah, 65, Egyptian-Spanish oriental dancer.
Dickie Dodds, 82, English cricket player.
Samuel Epstein, 81, Canadian-American geochemist.
David Kipiani, 49, Georgian football player and manager, car accident.
Ruth Morris, 67, Canadian author and legal reformer.
Anatoly Pozdnyakov, Russian general, K.I.A.

18
Ernie Coombs, 73, American-Canadian actor (Mr. Dressup).
Mildred Dixon, 96, American Cotton Club dancer.
Jane du Pont Lunger, 87, American heiress and philanthropist.
Isaiah Harris, 76, American baseball player.
Rachmat Kartolo, 63, Indonesian actor and singer.
Hank Levy, 73, American jazz composer and saxophonist, congestive heart failure.
David McNicol, 88, Australian diplomat.
Sandy Saddler, 75, American boxer.
Barry Shepherd, 64, Australian cricket player.
Amy Witting, 83, Australian novelist and poet.

19
Jane Dudley, 89, American modern dancer, choreographer, and teacher.
Nguyễn Tôn Hoàn, 84, South Vietnamese politician, led the Đại Việt Quốc Dân Đảng (Nationalist Party of Greater Vietnam)
Rhys Jones, 60, Welsh-Australian archaeologist, known for dating the arrival of Indigenous Australians.
Raymond Alphonse Lucker, 74, American prelate of the Catholic Church.
Louis Gonzaga Mendez Jr., 86, United States Army officer, stroke.
Cosmo Nevill, 94, British army general.
Ramanbhai Patel, 76, Indian chemist.
Nina Roscher, 62, American chemist and activist, breast cancer.
Darryl Sambell, 55, Australian talent manager and music promoter, lung cancer.
Bill Stafford, 63, American baseball player.
David Thomas, 89, Welsh cricketer.
Cirilo R. Zayas, 72, Paraguayan composer and writer.

20
Patsy Adam-Smith, 77, Australian author and historian.
Victor Henry Anderson, 84, American priest and poet.
George Archie, 87, American baseball player.
George Grosvenor, 91, American professional football player (Colorado, Chicago Bears, Chicago Cardinals).
Bill Gunn, 81, Australian politician.
Billy "Hinky" Harris, 66, Canadian professional ice hockey player (Toronto Maple Leafs, Detroit Red Wings, Oakland Seals, Pittsburgh Penguins).
Marcos Pérez Jiménez, 87, Venezuelan military officer and President of Venezuela.
Lewis Rudin, 74, American real estate investor and developer.
Joe Stephenson, 80, American baseball player.
Eberhard Wenzel, 51, German public health researcher.

21
David S. Dennison Jr., 83, American politician (U.S. Representative for Ohio's 11th congressional district from 1957 to 1959).
Daniel J. Murphy, 79, four-star admiral in the US Navy, stomach aneurysm.
Dwayne O'Steen, 46, American football player, heart attack.
Ross Parker, 17, English victim of racially motivated crime, stabbed.
Helmut Rüffler, 83, German Luftwaffe flying ace during World War II.

22
Hilde Holger, 95, Austrian-British expressionist dancer and choreographer.
Fikret Kızılok, 54, Turkish rock musician, heart attack.
Sir William Knox, 73, Australian politician.
Fred Neher, American cartoonist.
Sir Gordon Reece, 71, British journalist and political strategist.
Isaac Stern, 81, Ukrainian-American violinist, congestive heart failure.

23
Robert Abel, 64, American pioneer in visual effects and computer animation, heart attack
W. S. Barrett, 87, British classical scholar.
Kevin Boland, 83, Irish politician.
Allen Curnow, 90, New Zealand poet and journalist.
Ron Hewitt, 73, Welsh footballer.
Don May, 77, Australian politician.
Sara Stern-Katan, 82, Israeli social worker and politician.
Dorothy Wyatt, 75, Canadian politician.

24
Raghunath Pandey, 79, Indian politician and businessperson.
Peter Shore, Baron Shore of Stepney, 77, British politician.
Sir Ruthven Wade, 81, British air chief marshal.
Eldon Woolliams, 85, Canadian politician and lawyer.
Arthur Wynn, 91, British civil servant and recruiter of Soviet spies.

25
Marian Breland Bailey, 80, American psychologist.
Irving Bernstein, 84, American labor historian and professor of political science at the University of California, Los Angeles.
Samar Das, 75, Bangladeshi musician and composer.
Ndèye Coumba Mbengue Diakhaté, Senegalese educator and poet.
Robert W. Floyd, 65, American computer scientist (Floyd–Warshall algorithm, Floyd's cycle-finding algorithm, Floyd–Steinberg dithering, Hoare logic).
Herbert Klein, 78, German Olympic swimmer (bronze medal winner in the 200 meter breaststroke at the 1952 Summer Olympics).
Dolores Michaels, 68, American actress.
Marc North, 35, English professional footballer, complications from lung cancer.
Lani O'Grady, 46, American actress (Eight Is Enough) and talent agent.
John Powers, 72, American baseball player.
Paul Seiler, 55, American football player.
Anna Spitzmüller, 98, Austrian art historian and curator.

26
Clarice Cross Bagwell, 86, American educator and activist.
Ritter Collett, 80, American sports editor.
Helia Bravo Hollis, 99, Mexican botanist.
Ozzie Simmons, 87, American college football player.
Sagat Singh, 82, Indian Army officer.
Shawn Walsh, 46, American ice hockey coach, kidney cancer.

27
Herman Berlinski, 91, German-American musician.
Sir James Cable, 80, British diplomat.
Helen Cherry, 85, English actress (Three Cases of Murder, The Naked Edge, The Charge of the Light Brigade).
Linda Smith Dyer, 53, American lawyer and women's rights activist, cancer.
Kotla Vijaya Bhaskara Reddy, 81, Indian politician.
Philip Rosenthal, 84, German industrialist, socialite and politician.
Dick Rozek, 74, American baseball player.

28
Ernest Ačkun, 71, Yugoslav clarinetist.
James H. Brickley, 72, American judge and politician. 
R. J. Hollingdale, 70, British biographer and translator of German philosophy and literature.
Isao Inokuma, 63, Japanese Olympic judoka (gold medal winner in men's heavyweight judo at the 1964 Summer Olympics), seppuku.
Ejner Johansson, 79, Danish art historian, writer, and documentary film director.
Mohammad Khalequzzaman, member of the then National Assembly of Pakistan and Union Minister of Labor, died on 28 September 2001.
Jack Maguire, 76, American baseball player.
Martin O'Hagan, 51, Irish investigative journalist, murdered.

29
Viktor Belov, 76, Russian football player and manager.
Mabel Fairbanks, 85, American figure skater and coach.
Gloria Foster, 67, American actress (The Matrix, The Comedians, City of Hope).
Frank Gasparro, 92, American Chief Engraver of the United States Mint (Susan B. Anthony dollar, Eisenhower Dollar, Lincoln cent reverse, Kennedy half dollar reverse).
Benny Goldberg, 82, Polish-American bantamweight boxer.
Bernt Heiberg, 92, Norwegian architect.
John Noriega, 57, American baseball player.
Jimmy O'Connor, 83, English playwright.
Eleanor Phelps, 94, American actress.
Nguyễn Văn Thiệu, 78, South Vietnamese military officer and politician, 2nd President of South Vietnam.
Mary Wilkinson Streep, 86, American fine-artist and art editor.

30
Consuelo Araújo, 61, Colombian politician, writer and journalist, murdered  by the FARC.
Luis Barboo, 74, Spanish actor.
Gerhard Ebeling, 89, German Lutheran theologian.
George Gately, 72, American cartoonist (Heathcliff).
Calvin C. Hernton, 69, American sociologist, poet and author, known for his 1965 book Sex and Racism in America.
Jenny Jugo, 96, Austrian actress.
John C. Lilly, 86, American physician, writer, inventor and counterculture scientist.
Madhavrao Scindia, 56, Prominent Indian politician and minister, a royal family member, Maharaja of Gwalior.

References 

2001-09
 09